Samaná Airport may refer to:

 Samaná El Catey International Airport in Samaná province, Dominican Republic
 Arroyo Barril International Airport in Samaná province, Dominican Republic